Zhu Shimao (born 28 March 1954) is a Chinese comedian, sketch actor, and actor. Zhu's partner is Chen Peisi.

Biography
In 1954, Zhu was born in Linyi, Shandong. Zhu joined the Chinese People's Liberation Army, he worked as an actor in the Fuzhou Military Region. In 1983, he worked in August First Film Studio as an actor. In 1984, Zhu and his partner Chen Peisi performed Eating Noodles and became widely known. In 2000, Zhu and his partner Chen Peisi sued the China International Television Corporation, but they were banned by China Central Television.

Personal life
Zhu married Fan Xuxia, the couple has a son named Zhu Qingyang (born 1991) .

Filmography

Lotus Code (2015)

References

1954 births
Living people
People from Linyi
Chinese male comedians
Male actors from Shandong
Chinese film directors
21st-century Chinese male actors
20th-century Chinese male actors
Film directors from Shandong
Chinese male film actors
Chinese male stage actors